Bayan (Chinese spelling as "Bayin", born August 1963) is an ethnic Mongol actor and director from Inner Mongolia. He is known for his roles in Laughing in the Wind (2001), The Legend of the Condor Heroes (2003), and Demi-Gods and Semi-Devils (2003). Sichin Hangru (2009), his first  film as a director, won the Best National Theme Creation Award at the 17th Beijing College Student Film Festival, a Special Award at the Cologne Mediterranean Film Festival, and a Best Director Award by the Mongolia National Film Association.  Another film of his, Norjmaa (2015), earned him a Best Small and Medium Cost Feature Award in the 30th Golden Rooster Awards, a Best Film Award at the 33rd Fajr International Film Festival, and a Best National Theme Creation Award at the 21st Beijing College Student Film Festival, and received Golden Rooster Award nomination for Best Director.

Biography

Early life
Born in Ushin Banner (Uxin in Chinese spelling), Ordos City, Inner Mongolia in August 1963 to a family of herdsmen, and he was brought up by his maternal grandmother. From 1980 to 1982 he attended the First Mongolian High School of Ordos City.  He was accepted to Shanghai Theatre Academy in 1982, and after graduation in 1986, he was assigned to the Inner Mongolia Minzu Theatre. In 1998, he studied directing at the Director Department of Beijing Film Academy as a part-time student.

Career
Bayan had his first experience in front of the camera in 1985 when he was a college student, and he was chosen to act as Jebe in the historical film Genghis Khan.

He landed some small appearances in several films, such as The Mongolian Captive (1987), Four Horsemen (1990), Rovers in West (1992), Rescue the Hostage (1993), and The Special Prisoner (1995).

In 1994, he had a cameo appearance as Ying Bu in the historical television series Hegemon-King of Western Chu.

In 1995, for his role as Che Ling in The Sorrow of Brook Steppe, he won the Best Collective Performance Award at the 16th Golden Rooster Awards.

He had a supporting role in the historical television series Romance of the Sui and Tang Dynasties (1996). Also in 1996, he participated in Empire Wu of Han as Jiang Chong, a villain in Han dynasty.

In 2001, he had a key supporting role as Xiang Wentian in the wuxia television series Laughing in the Wind, based on Hong Kong novelist Jin Yong's novel, opposite Li Yapeng and Xu Qing.

In 2002, he was transferred to Inner Mongolia Film Studio as an actor.

In 2003, he appeared in Demi-Gods and Semi-Devils as Jiu Mozhi, a wuxia television series adaptation based on the novel of the same name by Jin Yong. That same year, he played a role in another adaptation of Jin Yong's novel, The Legend of the Condor Heroes.

He starred in the historical television series Emperor Wu the Great of the Han Dynasty (2005), alongside Chen Baoguo, Gua Ah-leh, and Tao Hong.

He co-starred as Genghis Khan with Hu He and Ariel Lin in the 2006 wuxia television series The Legend of the Condor Heroes (2006), based on the novel by the same name by Jin Yong.

In 2007, he appeared in Paladins in Troubled Times, based on Liang Yusheng's novel.

He rose to fame after portraying King-in-law with gold wheel in Lee Kwok-lap's The Return of the Condor Heroes (2008), opposite Huang Xiaoming and Liu Yifei.

In 2009, he won accolades for his directorial feature film debut, Sichin Hangru. He won a Best National Theme Creation Award at the 17th Beijing College Student Film Festival, a Special Award at the Cologne Mediterranean Film Festival, and a Best Director Award by the Mongolia National Film Association.

For his role in Beyond the Sacred Land (2011), he was nominated for the Best Supporting Actor Award at the 28th Golden Rooster Awards.

He was the director of the feature film Norjmaa (2014), which earned him a Best Small and Medium Cost Feature Award in the 30th Golden Rooster Awards, a Best Film Award at the 33rd Fajr International Film Festival, and a Best National Theme Creation Award at the 21st Beijing College Student Film Festival, and received Golden Rooster Award nomination for Best Director.

Personal life
Bayan married Badmaa (Badema in Chinese spelling), who is also a noted actress and singer.

Filmography

Film

Television

Drama

Awards

References

External links

1963 births
People from Ordos City
Living people
Shanghai Theatre Academy alumni
Beijing Film Academy alumni
Male actors from Inner Mongolia
Southern Mongols
Chinese male television actors
Chinese male film actors
Chinese people of Mongolian descent